The Cardiff City Line is a commuter railway line in Cardiff that runs between  and  via .

History
Originally the line was freight-only, but over the years saw regular use for empty passenger trains thanks to its links with the depot at Cardiff Canton TMD  and also for football specials to Ninian Park stadium and periodic engineering diversions.

The new service was introduced by British Rail in co-operation with  the Mid Glamorgan and South Glamorgan County Councils.

Services

There are currently trains every half hour which drop to every hour in the evenings on Mondays-Saturdays. There is no Sunday service on the line.
Services normally continue to  via the Coryton Line.
Transport for Wales currently operates the line as part of the former Valley Lines network. TfW succeeded the previous franchisee Arriva Trains Wales in October 2018. Some freight services also use the line.

Trains
TfW operates the line with diesel multiple units of Sprinter classes 150 and 153.

Electrification
On 16 July 2012 the Department for Transport announced plans to electrify the line. This will require new electric multiple unit trains and should reduce journey times, operating costs and maintenance costs. Work was expected to start between 2014 and 2019, but was pushed back to between 2019 and 2024.

This in turn is part of a £9.4 billion investment in railways in England and Wales.

However, these plans have since been replaced by Welsh Government's South Wales Metro. This line has been partially taken over, and is now being electrified.

See also
 List of railway stations in Cardiff

References

Railway lines in Wales
City Line
Railway lines opened in 1987